Topalan is a village in the Bingöl District, Bingöl Province, Turkey. The village had a population of 112 in 2021.

The hamlet of Germik is attached to the village.

References 

Villages in Bingöl District
Kurdish settlements in Bingöl Province